Odongo or Odongo Adventure on the African Frontier is a 1956 British Warwick Films CinemaScope African adventure drama film directed by John Gilling and starring Rhonda Fleming, Macdonald Carey and Juma. The screenplay concerns a white hunter who falls in love with a vet in Kenya.

Plot

Pamela, a veterinarian from Pittsburgh, comes to Kenya to work on big-game hunter Steve Stratton's farm. He was expecting a man and doesn't want her there.

The exotic animals Steve hunts and collects are precious to young native Odongo, who is employed by him. When another worker, Walla, is fired, he attacks Odongo, whose pet chimp comes to his rescue. Steve threatens to send the chimp to a zoo.

Odongo misses on purpose during a safari when Steve orders him to shoot an impala. Steve also saves Pam from a charging rhino and hopes she will leave. But his attitude softens after Pam delivers a native's baby and is given a rare animal as a reward.

The angry Walla frees all of the animals from their pens and starts a fire. Odongo is accused by Steve, then is taken hostage by Walla and pushed from a cliff into crocodile-filled waters. Steve jumps in to save him, while Walla fatally encounters one of Odongo's animals while trying to escape. Pamela agrees to stay.

Cast
 Rhonda Fleming - Pamela Muir
 Macdonald Carey - Steve Stratton
 Juma - Odongo
 Eleanor Summerfield - Celia Watford
 Francis de Wolff - George Watford
 Leonard Sachs - Game Warden
 Earl Cameron - Hassan
 Dan Jackson - Walla
 Michael Caridia - Lester Watford
 Errol John - Mr Bawa
 Paul Hardtmuth - Mohammed
 Bartholomew Sketch - Leni
 Lionel Ngakane - Leni's Brother

References

External links

1956 films
British drama films
1956 drama films
Films directed by John Gilling
Films about hunters
Films set in Kenya
Films shot in Kenya
CinemaScope films
Films shot at MGM-British Studios
1950s English-language films
1950s British films